Paul Casey (born 29 July 1969) is an English former footballer who played as a goalkeeper.

Career
After progressing through the club's academy, Casey made his Cambridge United debut in the 1987–88 season. After a singular Football League appearance for Cambridge, Casey joined Chelmsford City, before joining hometown club Great Yarmouth Town.

In September 2019, Casey, alongside Darren Cockrill, took temporary charge of Gorleston in a 1–1 draw against Hadleigh United.

References

1969 births
Living people
Association football goalkeepers
English footballers
Sportspeople from Great Yarmouth
Cambridge United F.C. players
Chelmsford City F.C. players
Great Yarmouth Town F.C. players
English football managers
Gorleston F.C. managers
English Football League players